The Maryland Transportation Authority Police is the eighth-largest law enforcement agency in the U.S. state of Maryland and is charged with providing law enforcement services on Maryland Transportation Authority highways and facilities throughout the Maryland, in addition to contractual services that are provided at Baltimore–Washington International Thurgood Marshall Airport, and the Port of Baltimore.

History 

The Maryland Transportation Authority Police trace their beginnings to the opening of the new Baltimore Harbor Tunnel and the Harbor Tunnel Thruway connecting highways (now part of Interstate 895) which crosses under the Patapsco River of Baltimore's Harbor in 1957, when the municipal "Harbor Tunnel Thruway Special Police Force" was established. In 1971, this force developed a State-authorized Police Academy, Commercial Vehicle Safety Division, police-apprenticeship program, and an Honor/Color Guard. An additional under-harbor tunnel was added in the mid-1980s with the construction of the parallel Fort McHenry tunnel for Interstate 95. In 1998, by act of the Maryland General Assembly the previous Maryland Port Administration Police was abolished and the members were merged into the larger Maryland Transportation Authority Police under the new Maryland Department of Transportation. The new police force assumed law enforcement responsibilities for the Helen Delich Bentley Port of Baltimore facilities including the Canton, Seagirt, Dundalk, Clinton Street, Fairfield and Locust Point Marine Terminals, as well as the downtown Baltimore World Trade Center on East Pratt Street at the "Inner Harbor". Today the MDTA Police force has grown to encompass law enforcement responsibilities at all of Maryland's transportation facilities projects, also including the Baltimore–Washington International Thurgood Marshall Airport, and the Helen Delich Bentley Port of Baltimore.

Chiefs of Police
 Chief Kevin Anderson, 2020–Present
 Chief Jerry Jones, 2015–2020
 Chief Michael Kundrat, 2013–2015
 Chief Marcus L. Brown, 2007–2011
 Chief Gary McLhinney, 2003–2007
 Chief Larry Harmel, 1997–2003
 Chief Edward Hechmer, 1982–1997
 Acting Commander Lionel Foote, 1981–1982
 Major Walter Wallace, 1977–1981
 Captain John J. Zimmerer 1971–1977
 Captain John J. Zimmerer 1957–1971

Overview 

The Maryland Transportation Authority Police, the first state law enforcement agency to be nationally accredited in the state of Maryland, is the second-largest state law enforcement agency and the eighth-largest law enforcement agency in Maryland, with approx. 500 sworn officers and 100 civilian law enforcement professionals.

The Maryland Transportation Authority Police provide law enforcement services to some of the most critical transportation infrastructures in the state of Maryland. These areas include all Maryland Transportation Authority highways, such as Interstate 95 within the city of Baltimore north to the Delaware state line, Interstate 895, portions of Interstate 695, U.S. Routes 40, 50, 301, and the Intercounty Connector (MD 200).

In addition to these responsibilities the Maryland Transportation Authority Police also handle the law enforcement services at the Baltimore Washington International/Thurgood Marshall Airport and the Port of Baltimore. The Maryland Transportation Authority Police also provide law enforcement services and inspections related to commercial vehicle truck safety on Interstate 95 (JFK Highway), Interstate 895, Interstate 695, US-50, US-40 and US-301.

The Maryland State Police, under contract with the Maryland Transportation Authority, provides law enforcement services along the John F. Kennedy Memorial Highway (IS 95 from northern Baltimore County to the Delaware state line).

Organizational structure

Special Operations Division

Patrol Division

Support Services Division

Logistics Division

Rank structure

The Maryland Transportation Authority Police is a paramilitary organization with a rank structure similar to the United States military. The ranks of corporal through lieutenant are based on promotional testing. Captains and above are appointed by the chief of police.

The Maryland Transportation Authority Police rank structure is as listed:

Training Academy 

Members of the Maryland Transportation Authority Police are professional law-enforcement officers who must meet established standards and successfully complete a rigorous training program as required by the Maryland Police Training Commission. Officer candidates receive this training at the Maryland Transportation Authority's Police Training Academy, a fully accredited police-training facility located near the "Francis Scott Key Memorial Bridge" Baltimore Beltway, Interstate 695. Officer candidates are expected to maintain physical and mental discipline throughout the academy.

The standard training course covers subjects such as criminal and motor-vehicle law, accident investigation, first aid, abnormal psychology, traffic control, criminal investigation, defensive tactics, weapons qualifications and court procedures. In addition, college credits are available at the Community College of Baltimore County's Dundalk campus.

Academy students are required to maintain a high academic standing during their seven-month classroom training. Upon graduation, officers will be assigned to field training officers for an additional eight weeks of training. Thereafter, officers are eligible for assignment to any of the Maryland Transportation Authority Police detachments located throughout Maryland.

Detachments

Specialized Units

Maryland Transportation Authority Police Specialized Units are:

 Homeland Enforcement and Traffic Team (HEAT)
 Motor Unit
 K-9 Unit
 Marine Unit
 Commercial Vehicle Safety Unit (CVSU)
 Commercial Enforcement and Response Team (CERT) formerly the Aggressive Driving Unit (ADU)
 Detective Unit
 Internal Affairs Unit (IAU)
 Crisis Negotiations Team (CNT)
 Collision Reconstruction Unit (CRU)
Special Response Team (SRT)
 Drug Recognition Expert (DRE)
 Bicycle Patrol 
 Honor Guard 
 Honor Guard Rifle Team
 Information and Technology Law Enforcement Unit (ITLE)
 Recruitment and Selection Unit
 Public Affairs Unit
 Training Unit

Equipment

Weapons

Maryland Transportation Authority Police Officers are currently issued a Glock 45 9mm, with a red dot sight. ("Safe Action") pistol. Some officers are also issued an 870 Remington 12-gauge shotgun, but all officers are certified to operate both weapons. Additionally officers are issued an ASP collapsible baton, OC Spray, Taser 7, handcuffs, flashlights and a radio.

Patrol Vehicles

The Maryland Transportation Authority Police currently use the police package Ford Crown Victoria, Ford Police Interceptor (sedan and utility models), Dodge Charger, Chevrolet Impala, and Chevrolet Caprice as their primary patrol vehicles. Chevrolet Express vans are used for prisoner transport.

Maryland Transportation Authority Police Awards
The Maryland Transportation Authority Police presents a number of awards to its members for meritorious service. The awards that the Maryland Transportation Authority Police awards to its officers are as follows:

 Award of Excellence
 Life Saving Award
 Distinguished Service Award
 Chief's Commendation
 Unit Commendation
 Motor Carrier Inspector of the Year
 Law Enforcement Supervisor of the Year
 Detachment Law Enforcement Officer of the Year
 Law Enforcement Officer of the Year

Fallen officers
Seven officers have died while on duty.

See also 

List of law enforcement agencies in Maryland

References

External links
The Maryland Transportation Authority Police Website
 The Maryland Transportation Authority Website
 Fraternal Order of Police Lodge #34, Maryland Transportation Authority Police

State law enforcement agencies of Maryland
Specialist police departments of Maryland
Transit police departments of the United States
Port police departments of the United States
Airport police departments of the United States